The Annie Award for Character Design in an Animated Feature Production is an Annie Award awarded annually to the best character designer and introduced in 2002. It rewards the design and look of characters for animated feature films.

Winners and nominees 
‡= live-action nominee

2000s

2010s

2020s

References

External links 
 Annie Awards: Legacy

Annie Awards